Tiruttangal railway station is a railway station in the town of Thiruthangal, Virudhunagar district in Tamil Nadu.

Background
The station was established during 1932. The station survived a closure during 1984 with strong protests from the residents of Thiruthangal, when the Southern Railway zone initiated such an action.

Jurisdiction
It belongs to the Madurai railway division of the Southern Railway zone of Virudhunagar district in Tamil Nadu. The station code is TTL.

Line

Facilities
The station saw major facelift in its facilities for passengers, when R. Chandramogan, a native and resident of Thiruthangal donated  for raising the level of platform after the gauge conversion, which wasn't done the respective authorities citing fund crunch. Also reverse osmosis purified water, parcel room, coach indicators and wheelchair ramp for physically challenged were established.

Notable places nearby
 Badrakali Amman temple, Sivakasi
 Ninra Narayana Perumal temple

References

External links

Railway stations in Virudhunagar district
Madurai railway division
Railway stations opened in 1932